Isabel Rodríguez García (born 1981) is a Spanish politician of the Spanish Socialist Workers' Party (PSOE), serving as Mayor of Puertollano since 2019. She has been a member of the Senate (2003–2007) and the Congress of Deputies (2011–2019).

Biography 
Born on 5 June 1981 in Abenójar (province of Ciudad Real), she became a member of the Socialist Youth when she was 15 years old. She earned a licentiate degree in Law from the University of Castile-La Mancha. Elected as senator at the 2004 Spanish general election in representation of Ciudad Real after commanding  votes, she became the youngest female member of the Upper House ever.
In 2007, Rodríguez was appointed as Director General of Youth of the Regional Government of Castilla–La Mancha, and in 2008, as Spokesperson of the Regional Government.

She stood as candidate to the Congress of Deputies in the 2011 general election, running second in the PSOE list in Ciudad Real. Elected as member of the 10th term of the Congress of Deputies, she renovated her seat at the 2015 and 2016 general elections.

Designated as PSOE's head of list and prospective mayoral candidate vis-à-vis the 2019 Puertollano municipal election in 2019, the PSOE list earned 10 councillors out of a total 21, and she was invested mayor of the municipality on 16 June 2019 with a plurality of votes of the new municipal council, retaining control of what it was a stronghold for the PSOE since the advent of democracy at the 1979 municipal election.

References 

1981 births
Mayors of places in Castilla–La Mancha
Members of the 10th Congress of Deputies (Spain)
Members of the 11th Congress of Deputies (Spain)
Members of the 12th Congress of Deputies (Spain)
Members of the 8th Senate of Spain
Living people
Municipal councillors in the province of Ciudad Real
Puertollano